Falangist movements existed in a number of countries including Spain, Poland, Lebanon, and in various Latin American countries.

Europe

France
Phalange Française

Poland
National Radical Camp Falanga

Spain
Spanish Falange
Authentic Falange

Asia

Lebanon
Kataeb Party

Philippines
Philippine Falange

Americas

Argentina
Tacuara Nationalist Movement
Authentic Falange (Argentina)

Bolivia
Bolivian Socialist Falange

Chile
Revolutionary National Syndicalist Movement of Chile
Spanish Action Circle

Colombia
National Patriotic Falange of Colombia

Cuba
Cuban Falange

Ecuador
Ecuadorian Nationalist Revolutionary Alliance

Mexico
Acción Revolucionaria Mexicanista
National Synarchist Union
Organización Nacional del Yunque

Peru
Falange Peru

United States

Puerto Rico
Boricua Falange

Venezuela
Authentic Nationalist Party
Falange Venezolana

Falangism